Shahram Baratpouri, is a former Iranian football player.

Club career
He previously played for the Payam Mashhad from 1996–1998 and Persepolis F.C. from 1995–1996 and 1998–1999, Foolad F.C. in 1998. and Sanat Naft Abadan F.C. in 2004–2005

References

Iranian footballers
Persepolis F.C. players
Payam Mashhad players
Foolad FC players
Sanat Naft Abadan F.C. players
Living people
Association football midfielders
Year of birth missing (living people)